Aspergillus transcarpathicus is a species of fungus in the genus Aspergillus. It is from the Cervini section. The species was first described in 2016. It has been reported to produce asparvenones, terremutin, 4-hydroxymellein, and xanthocillin.

References 

transcarpathicus
Fungi described in 2016